Susan Small is a former British slalom canoeist who competed in the late 1970s and the early 1980s. She won a silver medal in the K-1 team event at the 1981 ICF Canoe Slalom World Championships in Bala.

References

British female canoeists
Living people
Year of birth missing (living people)
Medalists at the ICF Canoe Slalom World Championships